The Mulford Biological Exploration of the Amazon Basin was a scientific expedition to the Amazon conducted in 1921. It was organized by Henry Hurd Rusby, who at age 64, was a well known explorer, a professor at Columbia University, and a staff member at the New York Botanical Garden. He hired Orland Emile White, a staff member at the Brooklyn Botanic Garden, to assist with collection and handling of plant specimens. The expedition was financed by the H. K. Mulford Company, a pharmaceutical company. 

Its mission was to explore the Amazon Valley from the headwaters of the Quime River in Bolivia to the mouth of the Amazon River in Brazil. The expedition left La Paz, Bolivia, in July 1921. Rusby was forced to leave the expedition due to neuritis, an infected tooth, and his age; however, White and Martín Cárdenas continued to collect. The expedition lasted eight months, but never reached the Amazon.

Expedition
News from 1921:

The expedition leaves the field in March 1922:

Results 
The botanists returned with over 2,400 collections representing more than 1,500 species of plant life.  Their collections included a large amount of orchids, termites, economic plants and seeds.  Rusby worked through most of the samples himself identifying six new genera and 257 new species.  The main collection from the expedition are located at the New York Botanical Garden and at the Brooklyn Botanic Garden.

During the expedition, Gordon MacCreagh wrote a book about its trials and tribulations. White Waters and Black was published in 1923.

Members  
 Henry Hurd Rusby, director
 William M. Mann, entomologist 
 Orland Emile White, botanist
 Nathan Everett Pearson, ichthyologist 
 Walter Duval Brown
 Frederick Ludwig Hoffman
 Gordon MacCreagh
 G. S. McCarty
 Martín Cárdenas

References

See also
 Search Results: Mulford Expedition at the Smithsonian Institution

South American expeditions